Sandra Ramstein-Attinger (born as Sandra Attinger, also known as Sandra Ramstein) is a Swiss curler.

At the national level, she is a 2010 Swiss women's champion.

Teams

Private life
Sandra Attinger grew up in the Attinger family of Swiss curlers. Her father Bernhard with his brothers - Peter Jr., Werner, Ruedi and Kurt - won Swiss and European championships and Worlds medals when they played on Peter Jr.'s team. Her grandfather Peter Sr. is a 1972 Swiss men's champion (he was skip of a team where Bernhard played and won his first national men's gold in 1972). Peter Jr.'s son Felix is a skip of a team that won the Swiss men's silver in 2017 and bronze in 2016. Peter Jr. coached his team.

References

External links

Living people

Swiss female curlers
Swiss curling champions
Date of birth missing (living people)
Place of birth missing (living people)
Year of birth missing (living people)